Caborca is a municipality in Sonora in northwestern Mexico.

The area of the municipality is 10,721.84 km2, which is 5.78 percent of the state total.

Towns and villages

There are 341 localities in Caborca Municipality, the largest of which are:

Other localities include: Josefa Ortiz de Domínguez, 15 de Septiembre, Santa Eduwiges, Viñedo Viva, Ures, Rodolfo Campodónico, Poblado Cerro Blanco, Puerto Lobos, San Francisquito.

References

Municipalities of Sonora